Campo Verde is a census-designated place (CDP) in Starr County, Texas, United States. It is a new CDP formed from part of the La Rosita CDP prior to the 2010 census with a population of 132.

Geography
Campo Verde is located at  (26.391630, -98.913980).

Education
It is in the Roma Independent School District. The zoned elementary school is Delia Gonzalez (DG) Garcia Elementary School. Roma High School is the district's sole comprehensive high school.

References

Census-designated places in Starr County, Texas
Census-designated places in Texas